Cleveland University-Kansas City (CUKC) is a private university in Overland Park, Kansas, United States. Cleveland University-Kansas City is known primarily for its chiropractic doctorate program (D.C.) but it also offers associate, bachelor's, and master's degrees. The university has been in operation in the Kansas City area since 1922 and has occupied its current 34-acre Overland Park, Kansas, location since 2008.

History 
Cleveland University-Kansas City was founded in 1922 as the Central College of Chiropractic. The founders of the school were one of the first families of chiropractic, C. S. and Ruth Cleveland, and Perl B. Griffin. All three were graduates of Palmer College of Chiropractic. After two years Central College of Chiropractic was renamed Cleveland Chiropractic College.

In 1951 the college absorbed Ratledge System of Chiropractic Schools located in Los Angeles. In 1955 the school was rechartered as Cleveland Chiropractic College of Los Angeles. In 2011 the Los Angeles campus and the Kansas City campuses merged into the Overland Park campus.

In 2015, Cleveland Chiropractic College changed the name of the institution to Cleveland University-Kansas City. "The name change and expanded identity supports the university's degree program expansion, and is centered around the university's vision for providing leadership in health science and health promotion education," said Carl S. Cleveland III, university president and leader of the university's 10-year strategic plan. Today, the university is led by Carl S. Cleveland III, the grandson of the founders.

Accreditation 
Cleveland University-Kansas City is accredited by the Higher Learning Commission, one of the U.S. Dept. of Education's accrediting organizations for higher education institutions. The Doctor of Chiropractic degree program at Cleveland Chiropractic College is accredited by The Council on Chiropractic Education. CUKC's other degree programs follow their profession's accreditation standards.

See also
 List of chiropractic schools
 Chiropractic

References

External links 
 

Buildings and structures in Overland Park, Kansas
Education in Overland Park, Kansas
Chiropractic schools in the United States
Private universities and colleges in Kansas
1922 establishments in Kansas
Educational institutions established in 1922